The American Motor Vehicle Company was founded in Lafayette, Indiana in 1916. It manufactured pedal cars and built the Auto Red Bug and American Junior automobile models 1916 and 1920.

References

Defunct motor vehicle manufacturers of the United States
Motor vehicle manufacturers based in Indiana
Defunct companies based in Indiana
Lafayette, Indiana
Vehicle manufacturing companies established in 1916
1916 establishments in Indiana